P. emarginata may refer to:
 Paralimnophila emarginata, a crane fly species
 Peltaria emarginata, a species of flowering plant
 Prunus emarginata, the Oregon cherry or bitter cherry, a tree species native to western North America
 Pinguicula emarginata, a species of butterwort.

See also